Mermaids is a 1990 American family comedy-drama  film directed by Richard Benjamin, and starring Cher, Bob Hoskins, Winona Ryder, Michael Schoeffling, and Christina Ricci in her film debut. Based on Patty Dann's 1986 novel of the same name, and set in the early 1960s, its plot follows a neurotic teenage girl who moves with her wayward mother and young sister to a small town in Massachusetts.

Originally planned as the English-language debut of Swedish director Lasse Hallström, the film was ultimately directed by Benjamin after both Hallström and Frank Oz abandoned the project. Filming of Mermaids took place in various locations in Massachusetts in the fall of 1989.

Released in December 1990, Mermaids was met with critical acclaim, particularly for the performance of Ryder, who received a Golden Globe Award nomination and a National Board of Review Award. Ricci also won a Young Artist Award for her performance.

Plot
In 1963 Oklahoma, Charlotte Flax is a neurotic 15-year-old whose carefree single mother, Rachel, relocates Charlotte and her 9-year-old half-sister, Kate, each time she ends a relationship. Rachel's parenting approach - which more resembles friendship than mothering - troubles the anxiety-ridden Charlotte, who is embarrassed by her mother's flamboyant nature.

After ending an affair with her married employer, Rachel and her daughters move to the small town of Eastport, Massachusetts where she also gets a job as a receptionist for a lawyer. Charlotte is ecstatic about their new home's location, as it borders a convent, and she is obsessed with Catholicism, to the annoyance of her irreligious Jewish mother.

Charlotte soon becomes enamored with Joe Peretti, a 26-year-old caretaker of the convent and local school bus driver. Meanwhile, Rachel meets a local shoe store owner, Lou Landsky, and slowly begins a relationship with him. After the assassination of John F. Kennedy, Charlotte finds Joe ringing the convent bell and consoles him. However, as they begin to kiss, she feels filled with sin and flees. After the encounter, she begins fasting to purge her sinful thoughts, eventually passing out from hunger.

Uneducated about sex, Charlotte fears that God will punish her with pregnancy via immaculate conception, and decides to steal her mother's car and run away. She drives all night before stopping at the home of a young family in New Haven, Connecticut, claiming to have suffered car troubles.

The family invites her to have breakfast, but Lou arrives to retrieve Charlotte during the meal, having tracked her after reporting the car stolen. Rachel chastises Charlotte when she returns home, but Charlotte doesn't reveal why she ran away. The next day, Charlotte makes an appointment with a local obstetrician under the name Joan Arc. The doctor tells Charlotte it isn't possible for her to be pregnant as she is a virgin.

At a New Year's Eve costume party, Lou asks Rachel to marry and move in with him, but she declines, reminding him he is still legally married to his wife (who had left him). After the party, discovering her car refuses to start, Rachel is given a ride home by Joe. Upon arriving home, Rachel gives Joe a kiss, wishing him a happy New Year.

Charlotte observes the kiss and storms outside, accusing her mother of trying to thwart her budding relationship and asking Joe why he would kiss Rachel before he drives off. On New Year's Day, with Rachel out for the day with Lou, Charlotte stays home with Kate and dresses up in her mom’s clothes and makeup. She drinks some wine and offers some to Kate, who drinks a large amount without Charlotte knowing. Charlotte takes Kate to see the convent, and Charlotte—not knowing Kate is drunk—goes to check out the top of the bell tower by herself, leaving Kate behind to collect rocks near the river. Charlotte unexpectedly finds Joe in the tower, and they embrace and start to have sex. An unattended Kate falls in the river and nearly drowns, but the nuns from the convent save her.

While Kate recovers, an infuriated Rachel gets into an argument with Charlotte about being irresponsible and threatens to again move them to another town. The argument ends after Rachel slaps Charlotte across the face, and they subsequently have a calm, heartfelt conversation. Discussing her father, Charlotte realizes he is never coming back. Rachel ultimately agrees to Charlotte's plea to stay in Eastport at least one more year.

Over the following year, Rachel and Lou continue their relationship, while Joe relocates to California to open a plant nursery; he and Charlotte keep in contact via postcards. At school, she has gained a new reputation due to her sexual encounter with Joe, and replaces her Catholicism obsession with Greek mythology. Kate has recovered and has returned to competitive swimming, although the accident has left her hearing  "sounding fuzzy" sometimes.

The film ends with Rachel, Charlotte and Kate playfully dancing as they set the dinner table for a family meal, something they didn't use to do.

Cast
 Cher as Rachel Flax / Mrs. Flax
 Bob Hoskins as Louis "Lou" Landsky
 Winona Ryder as Charlotte Flax
 Michael Schoeffling as Joseph "Joe" Peretti  
 Christina Ricci as Kate Flax
 Caroline McWilliams as Carrie
 Jan Miner as Mother Superior
 Betsy Townsend as Mary O'Brien
 Richard McElvain as Mr. Crain
 Paula Plum as Mrs. Crain

Production

Development
Producers initially engaged Swedish director Lasse Hallström to direct Mermaids as his English-language feature debut, but he left the project to direct Once Around (1991). They subsequently hired Frank Oz as a replacement, but he also abandoned the project after clashing with actresses Cher and Winona Ryder. Ultimately, they hired Richard Benjamin to direct the project.

Producer Patrick Palmer commented that both Hallström and Oz had envisioned a darker tone for the film, and that at one point, Hallström's version of the film included Charlotte committing suicide.

Casting
Emily Lloyd was originally cast in the role of Charlotte Flax. She had begun shooting the film when Cher complained that Lloyd did not look enough like her to play her daughter. Winona Ryder, who impressed both Cher and then-director Oz in Heathers (1988), was subsequently cast in the part. Lloyd sued Orion Pictures Corporation and Mermaid Productions for breach of contract and received US$175,000 in damages; reaching a settlement on the second day of the trial, 30 July 1991.

Filming
Principal photography of Mermaids began September 25, 1989 in Massachusetts, and completed on December 15 of that year. The Flax house exterior was built for the film in Coolidge Point near Manchester-by-the-Sea, Massachusetts, and downtown Rockport, Massachusetts served as the fictional village of Eastport. In a rural area near North Easton, Massachusetts, the production crew built a  bell tower for the convent set as well as a cottage. Some interior photography was completed on a soundstage constructed in a warehouse in Malden, Massachusetts. The majority of the film was shot in Massachusetts, and some additional photography occurred in Rhode Island and New Hampshire.

Release

Critical response
On Rotten Tomatoes the film has a rating of 71% based on reviews from 24 critics. On Metacritic it has a score of 56% based on reviews from 20 critics, indicating "mixed or average reviews". Audiences surveyed by CinemaScore gave the film a grade "B" on scale of A to F.

Though the film’s coming-of-age story was seen as a somewhat familiar one, many critics argued the film was elevated by its performances—particularly Ryder’s—and a script imbued with "a quality of everyday surrealism". Hal Hinson of The Washington Post wrote, "The film's comedy springs out of the incongruous pairing of a rebellious, crazy mom and a devoutly conservative daughter—that and the nuttiness of having a Jewish girl obsessed with Catholicism." Of Ryder, Hinson wrote, "What's great about Mermaids is how easily it keys us into Charlotte's hilariously warped teenage thought-waves…Having made something of a specialty of woe-is-me, adolescent angst, Ryder finds a deeper level here, a level of comedy with something genuinely painful mixed in."

Vincent Canby of The New York Times wrote. "Mermaids, adapted by the English writer June Roberts from the novel by Patty Dann, is a terribly gentle if wisecracking comedy about the serious business of growing up." Roger Ebert of the Chicago Sun-Times gave it three out of four stars and wrote: "Mermaids is not exactly good, but it is not boring. Winona Ryder, in another of her alienated outsider roles, generates real charisma. And what the movie is saying about Cher is as elusive as it is intriguing."

In a negative review, Time Out New York wrote: "The film is burdened by curious details and observations, and its preoccupation with all things aquatic (little sister is an ace swimmer, Mom dresses up as a mermaid for New Year's Eve, etc.) is overworked. Characterization suffers, with Charlotte and Rachel too self-absorbed to engage our sympathies. Crucially, they just aren't funny".

Accolades

Soundtrack

References

External links

 
 Mermaids at MGM site
 
Interview with the Cast of Mermaids (1990), Texas Archive of the Moving Image

1990 films
1990 comedy-drama films
1990s coming-of-age comedy-drama films
1990s teen comedy-drama films
American coming-of-age comedy-drama films
American teen comedy-drama films
1990s English-language films
Films about Catholicism
Films about dysfunctional families
Films based on American novels
Films directed by Richard Benjamin
Films scored by Jack Nitzsche
Films set in 1963
Films set in 1964
Films set in Massachusetts
Films set in Oklahoma
Films shot in Boston
Films shot in Rhode Island
Films shot in Texas
Juvenile sexuality in films
Films about mother–daughter relationships
Orion Pictures films
Films about sisters
1990s American films